Trześń may refer to the following places:
Trześń, Kolbuszowa County in Subcarpathian Voivodeship (south-east Poland)
Trześń, Mielec County in Subcarpathian Voivodeship (south-east Poland)
Trześń, Tarnobrzeg County in Subcarpathian Voivodeship (south-east Poland)